Eroica (released in some territories as Heroism) is a 1958 Polish film by Andrzej Munk, and his second feature film after Man on the Tracks (1956). Eroica is composed of two separate stories, presenting satirical critiques of two aspects of the Polish character: acquisitive opportunism, and a romantic fascination for heroic martyrs.

The film’s title is an ironic reference to Ludwig van Beethoven”s Third Symphony, which the composer initially dedicated to then French head Consulate Napoleon Bonaparte. When Napoleon declared himself Emperor, Beethoven, a devout republican, withdrew the dedication in disgust and titled the work simply “Eroica.”

Eroica premiered on Polish Television in 1972 and depicts wartime couriers crossing the Tatra Mountains.

Eroica won the FIPRESCI Award at the 1959 Mar del Plata Film Festival.

Synopsis

Scherzo Alla Pollacca
The first part is a bitter, tragicomic story of Dzidziuś ("Babyface"), a street-wise bon-vivant, drunkard, and coward who unwillingly joins the Home Army during the Warsaw Uprising. Dzidziuś' wife, Zosia, is having an affair with a Hungarian officer and Dzidziuś reluctantly becomes the messenger between the Home Army and the Hungarian unit, which is considering changing sides.

Ostinato Lugubre
The second part is set in a POW camp for Polish soldiers. Lt. Zawistowski, one of the internees, decides to attempt to escape. While none of his fellow inmates are sure whether he succeeded, his absence upsets the guards and provides hope and inspiration for the prisoners. Soon his legend grows, making him a hero within the camp and helping to boost the prisoners' morale. However, it turns out that Lt. Zawistowski didn't actually follow through on his escape plans, but is hiding in the attic of one of the barracks. It turns out that he was hiding from his colleagues, whose ostentatious patriotism he simply could not stand.

Cast 
 Edward Dziewoński as Dzidziuś
 Tadeusz Łomnicki as Lt. Zawistowski
 Barbara Połomska as Zosia
 Ignacy Machowski as the Home Army Major
 Leon Niemczyk as the Hungarian officer
 Kazimierz Opaliński as the Home Army commander of Mokotów
 Kazimierz Rudzki as Lt. Turek
 Henryk Bąk as Lt. Krygier
 Roman Kłosowski as Szpakowski
 Bogumił Kobiela as Lt. Dąbecki
 Stanisław Bareja as a Home Army soldier
 Witold Pyrkosz as Kardas
 Wojciech Siemion as Lt. Marianek

Critical Assessment 

Historian Dorota Niemitz offers this on the cinematography of Eroica:

See also 
Cinema of Poland
List of Polish language films

Footnotes

Sources 
Niemitz, Dorota. 2014. The legacy of postwar Polish filmmaker Andrzej Munk. World Socialist Web Site. 13 October, 2014. https://www.wsws.org/en/articles/2014/10/13/munk-o13.html Retrieved 08 July, 2022.

External links 
 

1958 films
Films set in Poland
Films set in Warsaw
1950s Polish-language films
World War II prisoner of war films
1950s war drama films
Films directed by Andrzej Munk
Polish war drama films
1958 drama films
Polish World War II films